Phelps City is a census-designated place and unincorporated community in Atchison County, Missouri, United States. As of the 2020 census, its population was zero. It is the closest Missouri community to Brownville Bridge, a Missouri River crossing that is listed on the National Register of Historic Places.

Demographics

History
Phelps City was platted in 1868. The community was named for Willis Phelps, one of the owners of the town site. A post office was established at Phelps City in 1868, and remained in operation until 1954.

References

Census-designated places in Missouri
Unincorporated communities in Atchison County, Missouri
Unincorporated communities in Missouri
Census-designated places in Atchison County, Missouri